The Nuuanu Pali Tunnels are a set of four highway tunnels (two in each direction) on the Pali Highway (Hawaii Route 61) which pass through the Nuuanu Pali in Hawaii, United States. These tunnels serve as one of three trans-Koolau routes between Honolulu (leeward Oahu) and the communities of windward Oahu.
Also, the Nuuanu Pali Tunnels serve as a major transportation route from Kaneohe and Kailua over to Honolulu. These tunnels and the Pali Highway were built to provide a safer route through the mountain ridge, replacing a narrow, winding, and dangerous road over the mountain.

References

External links

Road tunnels in Hawaii
Transportation in Honolulu County, Hawaii
Buildings and structures in Honolulu County, Hawaii